The 2020–21 Chattanooga FC season was the club's second professional season playing in the National Independent Soccer Association, its first full season in NISA, and 13th overall since being established in 2009.

Club
Roster Technical staff 

 Equipment 
The club wore different kits for the 2020 and 2021 portions of the season. Hummel was the supplier and Volkswagen was the sponsor in the fall. For the spring, Louisiana Hot Sauce sponsored the home kit while German Bundesliga side VfL Wolfsburg sponsored the away kit.

Transfers

In

Out

Friendlies

Competitions

NISA Independent Cup 

Chattanooga was announced as one of the four NISA teams taking part in the inaugural NISA Independent Cup on July 1. The regional tournament is set to act as both a pre-season and chance to "provide a platform for professional and amateur independent clubs to play together on a national stage."

The team was drawn into the Southeast Region alongside former National Premier Soccer League rival Georgia Revolution FC and United Premier Soccer League sides Savannah Clovers FC and Soda City FC. Games will be played between Chattanooga's home field at Finley Stadium and two venues in South Carolina, with both the region's championship game and third place games taking place at Finley on August 1.

Standings

Matches

NISA Fall Season 

On June 4, NISA announced the initial details for the 2020 Fall Season with the member teams split into conferences, Eastern and Western.

Details for the Fall regular season were announced on July 31, 2020. Chattanooga will take part as a member of the Eastern Conference.

Standings

Results summary

Matches

Fall Playoffs

All eight NISA teams qualified for the 2020 Fall tournament, which will be hosted at Keyworth Stadium in Detroit, Michigan, beginning on September 21 ending with the final on October 2.

Group stage

Knockout stage

NISA Spring Season

NISA Legends Cup 
NISA announced initial season plans in early February 2021, including starting the season with a tournament in Chattanooga, Tennessee with a standard regular season to follow. The tournament, now called the NISA Legends Cup, was officially announced on March 10 and is scheduled to run between April 13 and 25. All nine NISA members teams take part in the Spring will be divided into three team groups. The highest placing group winner would automatically qualify for the tournament final, while the second and third highest group winners would play one-another in a semifinal to determine a second finalist.

Chattanooga were drawn into Group 3 alongside Los Angeles Force and New Amsterdam FC.

Standings

Group 3 results

Matches

Regular season 
The Spring Season schedule was announced on March 18 with each association member playing eight games, four home and four away, in a single round-robin format.

Standings

Results summary

Matches

Spring Playoffs

U.S. Open Cup 

As a team playing in a recognized professional league, Chattanooga would normally be automatically qualified for the U.S. Open Cup. However, with the 2021 edition shorted due to the COVID-19 pandemic, NISA has only been allotted 1 to 2 teams spots. On March 29, U.S. Soccer announced 2020 Fall Champion Detroit City FC as NISA's representative in the tournament.

Squad statistics

Appearances and goals 

|-
! colspan="18" style="background:#dcdcdc; text-align:center"| Goalkeepers

|-
! colspan="18" style="background:#dcdcdc; text-align:center"| Defenders

|-
! colspan="18" style="background:#dcdcdc; text-align:center"| Midfielders

|-
! colspan="18" style="background:#dcdcdc; text-align:center"| Forwards

|-
! colspan="18" style="background:#dcdcdc; text-align:center"| Left during season

|-
|}

Goal scorers

Disciplinary record

References 

Chattanooga FC
Chattanooga FC
Chattanooga FC
Chattanooga FC